Miloslav Verner (1938–2018) was a speedway rider from the Czech Republic.

Speedway career
Verner won the bronze medal in the 1971 Czechoslovakian Individual Speedway Championship. He also reached the final of the Individual Speedway Long Track World Championship in 1970.

He was also part of the Czechoslovakian team that reached the final of the 1970 Speedway World Team Cup.

World Final appearances

World Team Cup
 1970 -  London, Wembley Stadium (with Zdeněk Majstr / Jiří Štancl / Václav Verner / Jan Holub) - 4th - 3pts (0)

World Longtrack Championship
 1970 -  Scheeßel (13th) 6pts

Family
His cousins Jan Verner and Václav Verner were also international speedway riders.

References

1948 births
2018 deaths
Czech speedway riders